TV Globo (formerly Rede Globo) is a Brazilian free-to-air television network owned and operated by the media conglomerate Grupo Globo (formerly known as Organizações Globo). It was founded on April 26, 1965 by Brazilian journalist Roberto Marinho (1904–2003). Ilusões Perdidas was the first telenovela produced by the network.

 Indicates the winner of the Troféu Imprensa for Best Telenovela.

1960s

1970s

1970

1971

1972

1973

1974

1975

1976

1977

1978

1979

1980s

1980

1981

1982

1983

1984

1985

1986

1987

1988

1989

1990s

2000s

2010s

2020s

See also
 List of 8/9 PM telenovelas of Rede Globo
 List of 11 PM telenovelas of Rede Globo

References 

Rede Globo
 
Rede Globo telenovelas